Mohcine El Kouraji (born 1 December 1997 in Marrakech) is a Moroccan cyclist, who currently rides for Emirati club team Al Shafar Jumeirah Cycling Team.

He competed in the men's road race at the 2020 Summer Olympics.

Major results

2015
 1st  Time trial, National Junior Road Championships
 African Junior Road Championships
2nd  Team time trial
5th Road race
2016
 1st Overall Tour de Côte d'Ivoire
1st Young rider classification
 3rd Time trial, National Road Championships
 Challenge du Prince
3rd Trophée de l'Anniversaire
3rd Trophée de la Maison Royale
10th Trophée Princier
 8th Overall Tour du Maroc
1st Young rider classification
2018
 3rd Overall Tour de l'Espoir
2019
 2nd Time trial, National Road Championships
 2nd Time trial, National Under-23 Road Championships
 5th Trophée de la Maison Royale, Challenge du Prince
 8th Overall Tour of Mevlana
 10th Overall Tour of Central Anatolia
2020
 6th Grand Prix Gazipaşa
2021
 1st Stage 7 (TTT) Tour du Faso
 8th Road race, African Road Championships
2022
 National Road Championships
1st  Time trial
3rd Road race

References

External links

 
 
 
 

1997 births
Living people
Moroccan male cyclists
Olympic cyclists of Morocco
Cyclists at the 2020 Summer Olympics